Charles Lacy Craig (March 9, 1872 - August 7, 1935) was the New York City Comptroller.

Biography
He was born March 9, 1872, in Arcola, Illinois. He graduated from Washington University. He attended and graduated from Columbia University Law School. 

In 1921 he was convicted for contempt of court and received a 60-day jail sentence for criticizing federal judge Julius Mayer and that conviction was upheld by the New York Supreme Court in 1923, but remitted by President Coolidge that year.

He died on August 7, 1935, at the Hotel Senator in California.

References

New York City Comptrollers
1872 births
1935 deaths
Columbia Law School alumni
People from Illinois
Washington University in St. Louis alumni